The ICFTU African Regional Organisation (AFRO) was a regional organisation of the International Confederation of Free Trade Unions (ICFTU), representing trade unions from countries in Africa.

History
The organisation held its first congress in Accra in January 1957, but had little organisation in its early years.  In 1965, the ICFTU's secretariat placed the organisation under the direct control of the ICFTU General Secretary, and it did not regain its autonomy until 1972.  At that year's congress, F. T. Tekie of Ethiopia was elected as General Secretary of AFRO, but he was arrested in 1974.

but the current organisation was not fully formed until 1993.  In 2007, the ICFTU merged with the World Confederation of Labour (WCL).  AFRO merged with the WCL's Democratic Organization of African Workers' Trade Union, forming the African Regional Organisation of the International Trade Union Confederation.

Leadership

General Secretaries
1964: Momadou Jallow
1965: Post vacant
1972: Fisseha Tsion Tekie
1974: George Palmer (acting)
1979: Amos Gray
1993: Andrew Keilembo

Presidents
1960: Haroun Popoola Adebola
1964: Humphrey Luande
1965: Post vacant
1972: Alhaji Yunusa Kaltungo
1979: Boniface Kabore
1988: Sadok Allouche
1993: Madia Diop
2007: Mody Guiro

See also
 ITUC Regional Organisation for Asia and Pacific
 Trade Union Confederation of the Americas
 European Trade Union Confederation
 List of federations of trade unions

References

 2004 ICFTU-AFRO news archives

 
1957 establishments in Africa
2007 disestablishments in Africa
Trade unions established in 1957
Trade unions disestablished in 2007